Punta Sardegna is a panoramic site on the coast of northern Sardinia, near Porto Rafael, Palau.

A curious air force observatory with a view on Bocche di Bonifacio and La Maddalena.

See also
 Punta Sardegna Lighthouse

Geography of Sardinia